Sarız, formerly known as Sáros (Greek: Σάρος), is a town and district of Kayseri Province in the Central Anatolia region of Turkey. The mayor is Baki Bayrak (MHP).

History 
The history of the district goes back to ancient times, to 700 BC. Cilicia remained under the rule of Dulkadiroğulları Principality from Byzantine Empire and beylik, and was included in Ottoman Empire in the period of Yavuz Sultan Selim in 1515. The settlement, which was shown as a part of the Hurman district of the Elbistan district in the 16th century Ottoman records, was connected to the Aziziye district, which was created in 1861.
registered as a sub-district. During this period, the center of Sariz was called "Koyyeri". In the records of 1910, it is stated that Sarız, which is a township, has 46 villages. The Municipality organization was established on July 30, 1914, upon the request of the Sivas Governor of the time being approved by the Ottoman Ministry of Internal Affairs. In 1927, it was separated from Sivas and connected to Kayseri. In 1946, it was separated from the Pınarbaşı district to which it was affiliated and became an independent district.

References
 Sarız District Governorship Official Website
 Kayseri Governorship Official Website
 Sarız District Website

Populated places in Kayseri Province
Districts of Kayseri Province